

Peter Alfred Gross (1849–1914) was an American landscape painter known primarily for his French seascapes and countrysides.

Gross was born in Allentown, Pennsylvania, in the Lehigh Valley region of the United States.  Most of his career (1874–1914) was spent living and painting in France, where he also studied with Edmond Marie Petitjean.  He exhibited at the Paris Salon and at the Pennsylvania Academy of the Fine Arts.

Notable students of Gross included Arlington Nelson Lindenmuth, who was the husband of his cousin.

Major exhibitions
Art Institute of Chicago
Exposition Universelle (1889)
Paris Salon
Pennsylvania Academy of the Fine Arts
World's Columbian Exposition

Major collections
Allentown Art Museum, Allentown, Pennsylvania, U.S.

Footnotes

References

External links

1849 births
1914 deaths
20th-century American male artists
20th-century American painters
American Impressionist painters
American landscape painters
American male painters
Artists from Allentown, Pennsylvania